South Carolina Highway 284 (SC 284) is a  state highway in the U.S. state of South Carolina. The highway connects Westminster and Anderson.

Route description
SC 284 begins at an intersection with SC 81 southeast of Lowndesville, within Abbeville County, where the roadway continues as Tom Young Bridge Road. It travels to the east and immediately crosses Gill Creek. It curves to the northeast and intersects SC 71. Then, it travels along the southeastern edge of Antreville. Just after it leaves the city limits, it intersects SC 28/SC 184. The three highways travel concurrently to the northwest. Almost immediately, they enter Antreville, where SC 184 departs to the northwest. SC 28/SC 284 leaves the city limits and split. SC 28 enters Anderson County and has intersections with the western terminus of SC 201 (Level Land Road) and then SC 185 (Due West Highway). Farther to the northeast, it meets its eastern terminus, an intersection with SC 20 in Craytonville.

Major intersections

See also

References

External links

SC 284 South Carolina Hwy Index

284
Transportation in Abbeville County, South Carolina
Transportation in Anderson County, South Carolina